The fourth season of The Voice Brasil premiered on October 1, 2015 on Rede Globo in the 10:30 p.m. slot
immediately following the 9 p.m. telenovela A Regra do Jogo.

Coaches and hosts 
Three coaches  (Lulu Santos, Claudia Leitte and Carlinhos Brown) return for their fourth season. Daniel was replaced by Michel Teló. Tiago Leifert, the host of the show, also
returned. Actress Daniele Suzuki return to the show's social media correspondent, after two seasons hiatus.

Teams
Color key

Blind auditions
Color key

Episode 1 
Aired: October 1, 2015
Group performance
 "Tudo Azul" – The Voice Brasil coaches

Episode 2 
Aired: October 8, 2015
Coach performance
 "Torpedo" – Lulu Santos

 Episode 3 Aired: October 15, 2015
Coach performance
 "Sambo e Beijo" – Carlinhos Brown

Episode 4 
Aired: October 22, 2015
Coach performance
 "Falando Sério" – Claudia Leitte

Episode 5 
Aired: October 29, 2015
Coach performance
 "Tá Quente" – Michel Teló

The Battle rounds 
Color key

Episode 6 
Aired: November 5, 2015

Episode 7 
Aired: November 11, 2015

Live shows
The live shows is the final phase of the competition. It consists of the showdown, the playoffs, two weekly shows and the season finale.

Viewers in the Amazon time zone (Acre, Amazonas, Rondônia and Roraima) are cued to vote to save artists on the show's official website during the delayed broadcast.

Elimination chart 
Artist's info

Result details

Episode 8
Aired: November 18, 2015
Live Showdown
In the Live Showdown round, 16 artists (4 per team) were given a "fast pass" by their coaches, while the remaining 16 competed for 8 spots in the Live Playoffs.
Fast Passes

Episode 9
Aired: November 26, 2015
Live Playoffs 1
Guest performance
 "Romaria" – Michel Teló & Daniel

Episode 10
Aired: December 3, 2015
Live Playoffs 2
Guest performance
 "Dia Iluminado" – Carlinhos Brown & David Bisbal

Episode 11
Aired: December 10, 2015
Round of 16

Episode 12
Aired: December 17, 2015
Semifinals
Performances
 "Noite" - Lulu Santos & Silva & Don L; "Corazón" - Claudia Leitte feat. Daddy Yankee

Episode 13
Aired: December 25, 2015
Final

Non-competition performances:

Ratings

Brazilian ratings
All numbers are in points and provided by IBOPE.

 In 2015, each point represents 67.000 households in São Paulo.

References

External links
Official website on Globo.com

4
2015 Brazilian television seasons